Drengene fra Angora was a Danish television satirical comedy series. 
First airing in 2004, it has acquired cult status in its native Denmark.  Among its more popular sketches are Team Easy On, Landmandssønnerne og far, and Spændende mennesker.

The actors were Esben Pretzmann, Rune Tolsgaard and Simon Kvamm.

In 2004 the group made the hit song "Jul i Angora".

"Angora" is a reference to the Turkish city of Ankara, one of whose historic names is "Angora."

External links 
 Drengene fra Angora on website of Danish television station DR2 (Danish)
 

Danish comedy television series
2004 Danish television series debuts
2000s Danish television series
Danish-language television shows
DR TV original programming